Zederik is a former municipality in the western Netherlands, in the province of South Holland.

The municipality of Zederik was formed on January 1, 1986, through the merger of the former municipalities of Ameide, Hei- en Boeicop, Leerbroek, Lexmond, Meerkerk, Nieuwland, and Tienhoven aan de Lek. Zederik merged with Leerdam and Vianen into the municipality of Vijfheerenlanden in the province of Utrecht on January 1, 2019. The municipality was named after the Old Zederik, a small canal running through its area.

The population centres of Zederik consisted of Ameide, Hei- en Boeicop, Leerbroek, Lexmond, Meerkerk, Nieuwland, and Tienhoven aan de Lek.

Topography

Dutch Topographic map of the municipality of Zederik, Sept. 2014.

Notable people 
 Maarten Schakel Sr. (1917–1997) politician
 Teun Kloek (born 1934) economist and Emeritus Professor of Econometrics at the Erasmus Universiteit Rotterdam
 Govert Schilling (born 1956) popular-science writer and amateur astronomer
 Rita de Jong (born 1965) rower, she competed at the 1992 Summer Olympics
 Robin Chaigneau (born 1988) former cyclist

References

External links

Vijfheerenlanden
Alblasserwaard
Former municipalities of South Holland
1986 establishments in the Netherlands
States and territories established in 1986
Municipalities of the Netherlands disestablished in 2019